Kalná Roztoka is a village and municipality in Snina District in the Prešov Region of north-eastern Slovakia.

History
In historical records, the village was first mentioned around 1554 to 1568.  In 1877, the villages of Kalná and Roztoka came together to form the current village.

The village is known for its wooden church, which dates back to the early-mid 18th century.  The church is constructed of wood, but has white-washed clay plaster on the exterior walls, thus giving the appearance of a masonry building.  It is the only Lemko Rusyn church of this sort.

Geography
It has a population of about 615.

References

External links
 
 
https://web.archive.org/web/20070513023228/http://www.statistics.sk/mosmis/eng/run.html
http://www.regionsnina.sk/index.php?id=64&L=1

Villages and municipalities in Snina District
Zemplín (region)